KCNU may refer to:

 Chanute Martin Johnson Airport (ICAO code KCNU)
 KCNU (FM), a radio station (103.9 FM) licensed to serve Silver City, Idaho, United States